Free Radio Prijedor is a Bosnian local commercial radio station, broadcasting from Prijedor, Bosnia and Herzegovina. This radio station broadcasts a variety of programs such as music and local news.

Free Radio Prijedor was founded on 11 February 1997 as first private/commercial radio station in Prijedor area.

Radio station is formatted as an urban radio station that broadcasts entertainment-music and news program dedicated to the target group of listeners aged 20 to 45.

Program is mainly produced in Serbian language and it is available in the city of Prijedor and in municipalities in Bosanska Krajina area.

The owner of the local radio station is the company FreeMedia d.o.o. Prijedor which also operates DiV Radio radio station.

Estimated number of listeners of Free Radio Prijedor is around 404.233.

Frequencies
 Prijedor

See also 
 List of radio stations in Bosnia and Herzegovina
 Radio Prijedor
 DiV Radio
 Radio Sana
 Radio USK

References

External links 
 www.freeradioprijedor.com
 www.radiostanica.ba
 www.fmscan.org
 Communications Regulatory Agency of Bosnia and Herzegovina

Prijedor
Radio stations established in 1997
Prijedor